Dance Girl Dance is a 1933 American pre-Code musical film directed by Frank Strayer from an original screenplay by Robert Ellis. The picture stars Alan Dinehart, Evalyn Knapp, and Edward Nugent, and premiered on September 1, 1933.

Cast list
 Alan Dinehart as Val Wade Valentine
 Evalyn Knapp as Sally Patter
 Edward Nugent as Joe Pitt
 Ada May as Claudette
 Mae Busch as Lou Kendall
 Theodore von Eltz as Phil Norton
 Gloria Shea as Cleo Darville
 George Grandee as Mozart

References

External links
 
 
 

1933 musical films
1933 films
American musical films
Films directed by Frank R. Strayer
Films scored by Lee Zahler
American black-and-white films
Chesterfield Pictures films
1930s American films
1930s English-language films
English-language musical films